Martin Šviderský (born 4 October 2002) is a Slovak footballer who plays as a midfielder for Spanish club UD Almería B.

Early life
Born in Vranov nad Topľou of Eastern Slovakia, Šviderský began his career at the age of six with hometown youth side MFK Vranov nad Topľou. After playing for Zemplín Michalovce youth teams, he moved to Tatran Prešov. He also spent time on trial at Saint-Étienne and Celtic as 10-year-old, after impressing former player Ľubomír Moravčík.

Club career

Manchester United
On 26 April 2018, Šviderský agreed to join Manchester United's Academy, initially to the under-16 squad, but had to wait for clearance, and subsequently suffered a knee injury. On 26 February 2020, he signed his first professional contract with the club.

Šviderský made his senior debut with the under-23s on 29 September 2020, starting in a 0–0 away win over Rochdale, for the season's EFL Trophy. During the season, he was also named as the club's Scholar of The Year for the under-18 category.

On 10 June 2022, Šviderský was listed by United as the only Academy player which contract was due to expire to be offered a new deal, even though he had already announced his departure from the club days earlier through his Instagram account. He officially left the club on 1 July, after his contract expired.

Almería
On 7 July 2022, Šviderský signed a five-year contract with Almería, who was recently promoted to La Liga. He was the third player to move on a free transfer from Manchester United to Almería in three years, after Largie Ramazani and Arnau Puigmal. He was sent off during his debut for the reserves on 18 December, in a 3–0 Tercera Federación home win over El Palo.

International career
Šviderský represented Slovakia at under-17 and under-21 levels.

In December 2022, Šviderský was first recognised in a Slovak senior national team nomination and was immediately shortlisted in it by Francesco Calzona, who joined the side in late summer, for prospective players' training camp at NTC Senec.

Personal life
According to his social media communication on Instagram, Šviderský is a devout Christian.

References

External links

Besoccer profile

2002 births
Living people
People from Vranov nad Topľou
Sportspeople from the Prešov Region
Slovak footballers
Slovakia youth international footballers
Slovakia under-21 international footballers
Slovak Christians
Association football midfielders
Manchester United F.C. players
UD Almería B players
Tercera Federación players
Slovak expatriate footballers
Slovak expatriate sportspeople in England
Slovak expatriate sportspeople in Spain
Expatriate footballers in England
Expatriate footballers in Spain